Wincenty Zakrzewski (11 July 1844 in Dobrzykowo – 12 April 1918 in Kraków) was a Polish historian. He was a professor of the Jagiellonian University (since 1873), rector in 1890/1891. member of the Academy of Learning (since 1881). He participated in January Uprising (1863–1864).

Zakrzewski was researching Polish politics of 16th century. He was an initiator of modern studies about Reformation in Poland. His notable works includes Powstanie i wzrost reformacji w Polsce 1520–1572 [Beginning and rise of Reformation in Poland 1520–1572] (1870), "Po ucieczce Henryka: dzieje bezkrolewia" [After Henry's escape - the time of interregnum],  Stefan Batory... (1887), Historia powszechna [General history] (vol. 1–3; 1899–1903). He was also an initiator of publication Stanislai Hosii epistolae, orationes, legationes [Letters, speeches, legations of Stanislaus Hosius] (vol. 1–2; in: Acta historica res gestas Poloniae illustrantia; 1879–1888).

References
 
 

1844 births
1918 deaths
Jagiellonian University
20th-century Polish historians
Polish non-fiction writers
Polish male non-fiction writers
Rectors of the Jagiellonian University
19th-century Polish historians